Salvador Coreas may refer to:

 Salvador Coreas (footballer, born 1960), Salvadoran football winger and manager
 Salvador Coreas (footballer, born 1984), Salvadoran football forward